2012 in Ukraine is a list of the main events that took place in 2012 in Ukraine. There is also a list of notable people who died in 2012. In addition, a list of memorable dates and anniversaries of 2012 has been compiled. Over time, famous Ukrainians born in 2012 will be added.

 Left the London Olympics with 20 medals (6 gold, 4 silver, and 10 bronze). Ukraine at the 2012 Summer Olympics

Events 
 March 30 - Ukraine and the European Union initial an association agreement providing for the creation of a free trade zone and visa facilitation;
 April 2 - in Ukraine, the first flight on the route Kharkiv-Kiev went a high-speed train, designed to move at speeds up to 160 kilometres per hour, produced by the Kryukiv Railway Car Building Works;
 April 5 - Georgy Filipchuk, former Minister of Environmental Protection in the Second Tymoshenko government, is sentenced to three years in prison by the Solomyansky District Court of Kyiv;
 April 12 - Kyiv's Pechersk District Court sentences former Defence Minister Valery Ivashchenko to five years in prison;
 April 27 - Dnipropetrovsk explosions
 May 14 - Viktor Yanukovych signed the new Criminal Procedure Code of Ukraine;
 May 18 - The Supreme Court of the Russian Federation liquidated the Union of Ukrainians of Russia;
 June 8 - July 1 - Poland and Ukraine host the 2012 European Football Championship. In the final in Kyiv, Spain defeated Italy with a record score of 4: 0;
 July 31 - The Verkhovna Rada of Ukraine ratifies the agreement on a free trade zone with the Commonwealth of Independent States countries;
 August 17 - Former Interior Minister Yuriy Lutsenko sentenced to 2 years in prison;
 August 29 - September 9 - Paralympic Games in London, where Ukraine won fourth place;
 According to the State Statistics Service, in September, for the first time in 19 years, the population of Ukraine increased;
 September 26 - Karavan shooting;
 October 19 - Russian opposition leader Leonid Razvozzhayev is abducted and taken to Moscow near the UN Office for Refugees by Russian special services in Kyiv;
 October 28 - Ukraine holds parliamentary elections;
 November 7 - Prime Minister Mykola Azarov transfers a stolen Toyota Land Cruiser SUV confiscated from the Minister of Justice to the Ministry of Justice and orders the Ministry of Internal Affairs to register the vehicle;
 December 1 - Ukrainian Anna Ushenina became world champion in women's chess;
 December 3 - Mykola Azarov's government is dismissed;
 December 5 - Against the background of mass cancellation of flights, the largest air carrier in Ukraine "AeroSvit" filed for bankruptcy in the Commercial Court of Kyiv region;
 December 5 - In the annual Corruption Perceptions Index compiled by the international non-governmental organization Transparency International, Ukraine ranks 144th and is named the most corrupt country in Europe;
 December 15 - Trofimov Beheadings
 December 24 - Oleksandr Yaroslavsky under pressure from the city authorities sold the football club "Metalist" for $ 300 million;
 December 26 - Mykhailo Fomenko is approved as the head coach of the Ukraine national football team.

Died 
 February 1 - Stepan Sapelyak, Ukrainian poet, novelist, publicist, literary critic, human rights activist, public figure;
 February 3 - Vyacheslav Boykov, Ukrainian musician, pianist, teacher, Honored Artist of Ukraine;
 February 24 - Andriy Benckendorf, Ukrainian and Russian film director;
 March 8 - Oksana Makar
 March 17 - John Demjanjuk, a Ukrainian Red Army soldier, acquitted in 1993 by the Israeli Supreme Court of war crimes charges during World War II;
 March 20 - Atena Pashko, chemical engineer, poet and social activist
 May 23 - Borys Voznytsky, Ukrainian art critic, director of the Lviv Art Gallery, Hero of Ukraine (2005), winner of the Taras Shevchenko National Prize (1990);
 July 31 - Iryna Kalynets, Ukrainian poet;
 November 27 - Ivan Bilyk, Ukrainian writer and translator, winner of the Shevchenko Prize;
 December 18 - Anatoliy Zayayev, Honored Coach of Ukraine in football.

Shevchenko National Prize 2012 
This year the winners of the award were:

 art critic Tetyana Kara-Vasylieva - for the book "History of Ukrainian embroidery";
 artist Anatoliy Kryvolap - for a series of paintings "Ukrainian motif";
 poet Petro Midianka - for the book of poems "Luitra in the sky";
 writer Volodymyr Rutkivsky - for the historical trilogy for children "Jury";
 composer Victor Stepurko - for the musical work "Monologues of the Centuries".

Incumbents
President: Viktor Yanukovych
Prime Minister: Mykola Azarov

References

 
2010s in Ukraine
Years of the 21st century in Ukraine
Ukraine
Ukraine